The Braille pattern dots-2456 is a 6-dot braille cell with the top right, both middle, and bottom right dots raised, or an 8-dot braille cell with the top right, both upper-middle, and lower-middle right dots raised. It is represented by the Unicode code point U+283a, and in Braille ASCII with W.

Unified Braille

In unified international braille, the braille pattern dots-2456 is used to represent the labio-velar approximant, /w/, or otherwise as needed.

Table of unified braille values

Other braille

Plus dots 7 and 8

Related to Braille pattern dots-2456 are Braille patterns 24567, 24568, and 245678, which are used in 8-dot braille systems, such as Gardner-Salinas and Luxembourgish Braille.

Related 8-dot kantenji patterns

In the Japanese kantenji braille, the standard 8-dot Braille patterns 3568, 13568, 34568, and 134568 are the patterns related to Braille pattern dots-2456, since the two additional dots of kantenji patterns 02456, 24567, and 024567 are placed above the base 6-dot cell, instead of below, as in standard 8-dot braille.

Kantenji using braille patterns 3568, 13568, 34568, or 134568

This listing includes kantenji using Braille pattern dots-2456 for all 6349 kanji found in JIS C 6226-1978.

  - 馬

Variants and thematic compounds

  -  selector 1 + そ/馬  =  曹
  -  selector 2 + そ/馬  =  遂
  -  selector 3 + そ/馬  =  曾
  -  selector 4 + そ/馬  =  曽
  -  selector 4 + selector 4 + そ/馬  =  彖
  -  selector 5 + そ/馬  =  且
  -  selector 6 + そ/馬  =  丑
  -  selector 6 + selector 6 + そ/馬  =  豕
  -  そ/馬 + selector 1  =  牛
  -  そ/馬 + selector 2  =  羊
  -  そ/馬 + selector 3  =  豚
  -  そ/馬 + selector 4  =  午
  -  そ/馬 + selector 5  =  駒
  -  そ/馬 + selector 6  =  象
  -  そ/馬 + selector 6 + selector 6  =  豸
  -  比 + そ/馬  =  小
  -  そ/馬 + う/宀/#3  =  兎
  -  そ/馬 + 比  =  鹿

Compounds of 馬

  -  そ/馬 + ち/竹  =  馳
  -  そ/馬 + く/艹  =  馴
  -  そ/馬 + ゑ/訁  =  駁
  -  そ/馬 + た/⽥  =  駅
  -  そ/馬 + そ/馬 + た/⽥  =  驛
  -  そ/馬 + も/門  =  駆
  -  そ/馬 + そ/馬 + も/門  =  驅
  -  そ/馬 + へ/⺩  =  駐
  -  そ/馬 + え/訁  =  駸
  -  そ/馬 + か/金  =  騎
  -  そ/馬 + む/車  =  騒
  -  そ/馬 + そ/馬 + む/車  =  騷
  -  そ/馬 + り/分  =  験
  -  そ/馬 + そ/馬 + り/分  =  驗
  -  ち/竹 + そ/馬  =  篤
  -  く/艹 + そ/馬  =  薦
  -  け/犬 + そ/馬  =  駄
  -  ら/月 + そ/馬  =  騰
  -  も/門 + そ/馬  =  驚
  -  そ/馬 + す/発  =  罵
  -  ふ/女 + 宿 + そ/馬  =  媽
  -  そ/馬 + 宿 + 心  =  憑
  -  へ/⺩ + 宿 + そ/馬  =  瑪
  -  ま/石 + 龸 + そ/馬  =  碼
  -  に/氵 + う/宀/#3 + そ/馬  =  覊
  -  も/門 + 宿 + そ/馬  =  闖
  -  さ/阝 + 宿 + そ/馬  =  隲
  -  そ/馬 + 宿 + ゑ/訁  =  馭
  -  氷/氵 + う/宀/#3 + そ/馬  =  馮
  -  そ/馬 + 龸 + selector 3  =  馼
  -  そ/馬 + く/艹 + selector 4  =  駈
  -  そ/馬 + ふ/女 + ゑ/訁  =  駑
  -  そ/馬 + ぬ/力 + れ/口  =  駕
  -  そ/馬 + selector 4 + な/亻  =  駘
  -  そ/馬 + れ/口 + な/亻  =  駛
  -  そ/馬 + 宿 + ひ/辶  =  駝
  -  そ/馬 + 数 + る/忄  =  駟
  -  そ/馬 + 龸 + と/戸  =  駢
  -  そ/馬 + selector 5 + ゐ/幺  =  駭
  -  そ/馬 + 龸 + ち/竹  =  駮
  -  そ/馬 + す/発 + れ/口  =  駱
  -  そ/馬 + か/金 + selector 4  =  駲
  -  そ/馬 + 宿 + か/金  =  駻
  -  そ/馬 + 宿 + む/車  =  駿
  -  そ/馬 + た/⽥ + selector 4  =  騁
  -  そ/馬 + 宿 + い/糹/#2  =  騅
  -  そ/馬 + selector 4 + き/木  =  騏
  -  そ/馬 + 宿 + へ/⺩  =  騙
  -  そ/馬 + れ/口 + れ/口  =  騨
  -  う/宀/#3 + 宿 + そ/馬  =  騫
  -  そ/馬 + た/⽥ + ゐ/幺  =  騾
  -  そ/馬 + 宿 + く/艹  =  驀
  -  そ/馬 + selector 1 + う/宀/#3  =  驂
  -  そ/馬 + に/氵 + ね/示  =  驃
  -  そ/馬 + 宿 + つ/土  =  驍
  -  そ/馬 + 宿 + の/禾  =  驕
  -  そ/馬 + み/耳 + ゑ/訁  =  驟
  -  そ/馬 + 宿 + た/⽥  =  驢
  -  そ/馬 + 宿 + み/耳  =  驤
  -  そ/馬 + 宿 + き/木  =  驥
  -  そ/馬 + 宿 + け/犬  =  驩
  -  そ/馬 + 囗 + 比  =  驪
  -  そ/馬 + う/宀/#3 + そ/馬  =  驫

Compounds of 曹

  -  ひ/辶 + そ/馬  =  遭
  -  き/木 + selector 1 + そ/馬  =  槽
  -  の/禾 + selector 1 + そ/馬  =  糟
  -  ふ/女 + selector 1 + そ/馬  =  艚
  -  に/氵 + 宿 + そ/馬  =  漕

Compounds of 遂

  -  そ/馬 + さ/阝  =  隊
  -  そ/馬 + つ/土  =  墜
  -  火 + selector 2 + そ/馬  =  燧
  -  さ/阝 + selector 2 + そ/馬  =  隧

Compounds of 曾

  -  仁/亻 + そ/馬  =  僧
  -  と/戸 + そ/馬  =  層
  -  る/忄 + そ/馬  =  憎
  -  を/貝 + そ/馬  =  贈
  -  れ/口 + を/貝 + そ/馬  =  囎
  -  れ/口 + 宿 + そ/馬  =  噌
  -  そ/馬 + selector 6 + か/金  =  甑

Compounds of 曽 and 彖

  -  つ/土 + そ/馬  =  増

Compounds of 且

  -  ぬ/力 + そ/馬  =  助
  -  日 + ぬ/力 + そ/馬  =  勗
  -  こ/子 + ぬ/力 + そ/馬  =  耡
  -  く/艹 + ぬ/力 + そ/馬  =  莇
  -  か/金 + ぬ/力 + そ/馬  =  鋤
  -  う/宀/#3 + そ/馬  =  宜
  -  心 + う/宀/#3 + そ/馬  =  萓
  -  え/訁 + う/宀/#3 + そ/馬  =  誼
  -  た/⽥ + そ/馬  =  畳
  -  た/⽥ + た/⽥ + そ/馬  =  疊
  -  ね/示 + そ/馬  =  祖
  -  の/禾 + そ/馬  =  租
  -  い/糹/#2 + そ/馬  =  組
  -  さ/阝 + そ/馬  =  阻
  -  そ/馬 + の/禾  =  粗
  -  な/亻 + selector 5 + そ/馬  =  俎
  -  れ/口 + selector 5 + そ/馬  =  咀
  -  ふ/女 + selector 5 + そ/馬  =  姐
  -  や/疒 + selector 5 + そ/馬  =  岨
  -  ゆ/彳 + selector 5 + そ/馬  =  徂
  -  き/木 + selector 5 + そ/馬  =  柤
  -  に/氵 + selector 5 + そ/馬  =  沮
  -  め/目 + selector 5 + そ/馬  =  爼
  -  ま/石 + selector 5 + そ/馬  =  砠
  -  く/艹 + selector 5 + そ/馬  =  苴
  -  む/車 + selector 5 + そ/馬  =  蛆
  -  え/訁 + selector 5 + そ/馬  =  詛
  -  た/⽥ + 宿 + そ/馬  =  疂
  -  や/疒 + 宿 + そ/馬  =  疽
  -  そ/馬 + 宿 + ら/月  =  盖
  -  そ/馬 + 龸 + ら/月  =  葢
  -  そ/馬 + ん/止 + の/禾  =  齟

Compounds of 丑 and 豕

  -  ゐ/幺 + そ/馬  =  縁
  -  心 + ゐ/幺 + そ/馬  =  櫞
  -  龸 + そ/馬  =  豪
  -  れ/口 + 龸 + そ/馬  =  喙
  -  つ/土 + 龸 + そ/馬  =  壕
  -  き/木 + 龸 + そ/馬  =  椽
  -  に/氵 + 龸 + そ/馬  =  濠
  -  は/辶 + そ/馬  =  逐
  -  そ/馬 + ね/示  =  劇
  -  け/犬 + selector 6 + そ/馬  =  狃
  -  か/金 + selector 6 + そ/馬  =  鈕
  -  す/発 + す/発 + そ/馬  =  據
  -  日 + 宿 + そ/馬  =  曚
  -  ら/月 + 宿 + そ/馬  =  朦
  -  心 + 宿 + そ/馬  =  檬
  -  ま/石 + 宿 + そ/馬  =  毅
  -  火 + 宿 + そ/馬  =  燹
  -  め/目 + 宿 + そ/馬  =  矇
  -  く/艹 + 宿 + そ/馬  =  蒙
  -  そ/馬 + selector 1 + ⺼  =  衄
  -  け/犬 + 宿 + そ/馬  =  豢
  -  ひ/辶 + す/発 + そ/馬  =  遽
  -  せ/食 + す/発 + そ/馬  =  醵
  -  る/忄 + selector 3 + そ/馬  =  忸

Compounds of 牛

  -  な/亻 + そ/馬  =  件
  -  ろ/十 + そ/馬  =  牽
  -  囗 + そ/馬  =  解
  -  よ/广 + 囗 + そ/馬  =  廨
  -  る/忄 + 囗 + そ/馬  =  懈
  -  む/車 + 囗 + そ/馬  =  蟹
  -  ひ/辶 + 囗 + そ/馬  =  邂
  -  え/訁 + そ/馬  =  許
  -  に/氵 + え/訁 + そ/馬  =  滸
  -  そ/馬 + 数  =  物
  -  そ/馬 + る/忄  =  惣
  -  そ/馬 + 氷/氵  =  牧
  -  そ/馬 + い/糹/#2  =  牲
  -  そ/馬 + し/巿  =  特
  -  れ/口 + そ/馬 + selector 1  =  吽
  -  う/宀/#3 + そ/馬 + selector 1  =  牢
  -  そ/馬 + selector 1 + ん/止  =  牴
  -  そ/馬 + そ/馬 + そ/馬  =  犇
  -  そ/馬 + 宿 + め/目  =  牝
  -  そ/馬 + 宿 + お/頁  =  牡
  -  そ/馬 + ら/月 + れ/口  =  牾
  -  そ/馬 + 宿 + と/戸  =  犀
  -  そ/馬 + の/禾 + ぬ/力  =  犁
  -  そ/馬 + の/禾 + selector 1  =  犂
  -  そ/馬 + 比 + え/訁  =  犒
  -  そ/馬 + 火 + 火  =  犖
  -  そ/馬 + つ/土 + を/貝  =  犢
  -  そ/馬 + 龸 + そ/馬  =  犧
  -  そ/馬 + 龸 + そ/馬  =  犧

Compounds of 羊

  -  や/疒 + そ/馬  =  痒
  -  や/疒 + そ/馬 + や/疒  =  癢
  -  む/車 + そ/馬  =  蟻
  -  ゑ/訁 + そ/馬  =  詳
  -  み/耳 + そ/馬  =  躾
  -  せ/食 + そ/馬  =  鮮
  -  せ/食 + そ/馬 + や/疒  =  鱶
  -  や/疒 + せ/食 + そ/馬  =  癬
  -  心 + せ/食 + そ/馬  =  蘚
  -  そ/馬 + 囗  =  義
  -  そ/馬 + な/亻  =  儀
  -  や/疒 + そ/馬 + 囗  =  嶬
  -  日 + そ/馬 + 囗  =  曦
  -  ま/石 + そ/馬 + 囗  =  礒
  -  ふ/女 + そ/馬 + 囗  =  艤
  -  そ/馬 + こ/子  =  差
  -  れ/口 + そ/馬 + こ/子  =  嗟
  -  や/疒 + そ/馬 + こ/子  =  嵯
  -  て/扌 + そ/馬 + こ/子  =  搓
  -  き/木 + そ/馬 + こ/子  =  槎
  -  へ/⺩ + そ/馬 + こ/子  =  瑳
  -  ま/石 + そ/馬 + こ/子  =  磋
  -  い/糹/#2 + そ/馬 + こ/子  =  縒
  -  み/耳 + そ/馬 + こ/子  =  蹉
  -  そ/馬 + に/氵  =  洋
  -  そ/馬 + け/犬  =  美
  -  そ/馬 + ん/止  =  羨
  -  お/頁 + そ/馬  =  群
  -  そ/馬 + そ/馬  =  犠
  -  め/目 + そ/馬  =  着
  -  き/木 + そ/馬  =  様
  -  き/木 + き/木 + そ/馬  =  樣
  -  そ/馬 + れ/口  =  善
  -  そ/馬 + そ/馬 + れ/口  =  譱
  -  そ/馬 + き/木  =  業
  -  そ/馬 + や/疒  =  養
  -  に/氵 + そ/馬 + や/疒  =  瀁
  -  な/亻 + そ/馬 + selector 2  =  佯
  -  む/車 + そ/馬 + selector 2  =  恙
  -  囗 + そ/馬 + selector 2  =  觧
  -  そ/馬 + 宿 + ふ/女  =  姜
  -  や/疒 + う/宀/#3 + そ/馬  =  嵳
  -  よ/广 + 宿 + そ/馬  =  庠
  -  氷/氵 + 龸 + そ/馬  =  漾
  -  そ/馬 + 宿 + 宿  =  羌
  -  そ/馬 + 宿 + こ/子  =  羔
  -  そ/馬 + 仁/亻 + ろ/十  =  羚
  -  そ/馬 + 宿 + ん/止  =  羝
  -  そ/馬 + 宿 + そ/馬  =  羞
  -  そ/馬 + 宿 + そ/馬  =  羞
  -  そ/馬 + お/頁 + selector 1  =  羣
  -  そ/馬 + 宿 + 火  =  羮
  -  そ/馬 + 宿 + 氷/氵  =  羯
  -  そ/馬 + の/禾 + ゐ/幺  =  羲
  -  そ/馬 + 龸 + 囗  =  羶
  -  ⺼ + 宿 + そ/馬  =  羸
  -  そ/馬 + 龸 + 火  =  羹
  -  そ/馬 + む/車 + selector 2  =  翔

Compounds of 豚

  -  れ/口 + そ/馬 + selector 3  =  啄
  -  へ/⺩ + そ/馬 + selector 3  =  琢
  -  ひ/辶 + そ/馬 + selector 3  =  遯

Compounds of 午

  -  る/忄 + そ/馬 + selector 4  =  忤
  -  き/木 + そ/馬 + selector 4  =  杵

Compounds of 象 and 豸

  -  そ/馬 + ひ/辶  =  豹
  -  そ/馬 + ろ/十  =  豺
  -  そ/馬 + 日  =  貌
  -  く/艹 + そ/馬 + 日  =  藐
  -  心 + そ/馬 + selector 6  =  橡
  -  そ/馬 + selector 6 + く/艹  =  貘
  -  そ/馬 + 宿 + 比  =  豼
  -  そ/馬 + ぬ/力 + 囗  =  貂
  -  そ/馬 + な/亻 + き/木  =  貅
  -  そ/馬 + 数 + め/目  =  貊
  -  そ/馬 + 比 + り/分  =  貍
  -  そ/馬 + こ/子 + 宿  =  貎
  -  そ/馬 + 龸 + 比  =  貔
  -  て/扌 + 宿 + そ/馬  =  掾
  -  ち/竹 + 宿 + そ/馬  =  篆
  -  む/車 + 宿 + そ/馬  =  蠡

Compounds of 小

  -  ほ/方 + そ/馬  =  少
  -  ふ/女 + そ/馬  =  妙
  -  て/扌 + そ/馬  =  抄
  -  ん/止 + そ/馬  =  歩
  -  さ/阝 + ん/止 + そ/馬  =  陟
  -  火 + そ/馬  =  炒
  -  ま/石 + そ/馬  =  砂
  -  日 + そ/馬  =  秒
  -  そ/馬 + ぬ/力  =  劣
  -  そ/馬 + め/目  =  省
  -  も/門 + ほ/方 + そ/馬  =  尠
  -  き/木 + ほ/方 + そ/馬  =  杪
  -  め/目 + ほ/方 + そ/馬  =  眇
  -  に/氵 + ほ/方 + そ/馬  =  渺
  -  ゐ/幺 + ほ/方 + そ/馬  =  緲
  -  い/糹/#2 + ほ/方 + そ/馬  =  紗
  -  か/金 + ほ/方 + そ/馬  =  鈔
  -  そ/馬 + ⺼  =  肖
  -  宿 + そ/馬  =  宵
  -  れ/口 + そ/馬  =  哨
  -  に/氵 + そ/馬  =  消
  -  そ/馬 + と/戸  =  屑
  -  や/疒 + そ/馬 + ⺼  =  峭
  -  る/忄 + そ/馬 + ⺼  =  悄
  -  き/木 + そ/馬 + ⺼  =  梢
  -  の/禾 + そ/馬 + ⺼  =  稍
  -  え/訁 + そ/馬 + ⺼  =  誚
  -  は/辶 + そ/馬 + ⺼  =  趙
  -  ひ/辶 + そ/馬 + ⺼  =  逍
  -  か/金 + そ/馬 + ⺼  =  銷
  -  ち/竹 + そ/馬 + ⺼  =  霄
  -  と/戸 + そ/馬 + ⺼  =  鞘
  -  せ/食 + そ/馬 + ⺼  =  鮹
  -  さ/阝 + 比 + そ/馬  =  隙
  -  そ/馬 + 数 + り/分  =  尓
  -  そ/馬 + 比 + け/犬  =  尖

Compounds of 兎

  -  そ/馬 + そ/馬 + う/宀/#3  =  兔
  -  心 + そ/馬 + う/宀/#3  =  莵

Compounds of 鹿

  -  つ/土 + そ/馬 + 比  =  塵
  -  に/氵 + そ/馬 + 比  =  漉
  -  む/車 + そ/馬 + 比  =  轆
  -  か/金 + そ/馬 + 比  =  鏖
  -  く/艹 + そ/馬 + 比  =  麁
  -  へ/⺩ + そ/馬 + 比  =  麈
  -  の/禾 + そ/馬 + 比  =  麋
  -  こ/子 + そ/馬 + 比  =  麌
  -  き/木 + そ/馬 + 比  =  麓
  -  囗 + そ/馬 + 比  =  麕
  -  こ/子 + 宿 + そ/馬  =  麑
  -  き/木 + 宿 + そ/馬  =  麒
  -  そ/馬 + み/耳 + し/巿  =  麝
  -  の/禾 + 宿 + そ/馬  =  麟

Other compounds

  -  そ/馬 + 宿  =  争
  -  氷/氵 + そ/馬  =  浄
  -  氷/氵 + 氷/氵 + そ/馬  =  淨
  -  そ/馬 + そ/馬 + 宿  =  爭
  -  や/疒 + そ/馬 + 宿  =  崢
  -  ち/竹 + そ/馬 + 宿  =  箏
  -  か/金 + そ/馬 + 宿  =  錚
  -  ち/竹 + 龸 + そ/馬  =  筝
  -  す/発 + そ/馬  =  拠
  -  心 + そ/馬  =  蘇
  -  ⺼ + そ/馬  =  衆
  -  せ/食 + ⺼ + そ/馬  =  鰥
  -  そ/馬 + 心  =  慶
  -  そ/馬 + て/扌  =  挿
  -  そ/馬 + そ/馬 + て/扌  =  插
  -  そ/馬 + ら/月  =  蓋
  -  そ/馬 + ん/止 + selector 1  =  歃
  -  の/禾 + ほ/方 + そ/馬  =  穆
  -  ゑ/訁 + 宿 + そ/馬  =  聚
  -  心 + 龸 + そ/馬  =  蘓

Notes

Braille patterns